The Citadel Bulldogs basketball teams represented The Citadel, The Military College of South Carolina in Charleston, South Carolina, United States.  The program was established in 1900–01, and has continuously fielded a team since 1912–13.  Their primary rivals are College of Charleston, Furman and VMI.

1939–40

The Bulldogs moved into their new venue, The Citadel Armory on January 20, 1940.  Ben Parker replaced Rock Norman as head coach on January 27, 1940.

|-
|colspan=7 align=center|1940 Southern Conference men's basketball tournament

1940–41

|-
|colspan=7 align=center|Exhibition games

|-
|colspan=7 align=center|Regular Season

1941–42

1942–43

|-
|colspan=7 align=center|1943 Southern Conference men's basketball tournament

1943–44

1944–45

|-
|colspan=7 align=center|Exhibition games

|-
|colspan=7 align=center|Regular Season

|-
|colspan=7 align=center|1945 Southern Conference men's basketball tournament

1945–46

1946–47

1947–48

1948–49

|-
|colspan=7 align=center|Exhibition games

|-
|colspan=7 align=center|Regular season

References
 

The Citadel Bulldogs basketball seasons